Rock Creek High School (RCHS or RCMS) is a high school that sits between and serves the townships of St. George and Westmoreland, Kansas.  It is operated by Rock Creek USD 323 school district.

History
The school was established in 1991 and combined the student bodies of Westmoreland High School and Saint George High School. It originally enrolled grades 7–12. In 2020, an addition to the school was completed, increasing the grades enrolled to 5-12.

Academics

In 2009, Rock Creek Junior/Senior High School was selected as a Blue Ribbon School. The Blue Ribbon Award recognizes public and private schools which perform at high levels or have made significant academic improvements.

See also
 List of high schools in Kansas
 List of unified school districts in Kansas

References

1991 establishments in Kansas
Educational institutions established in 1991
Public high schools in Kansas
Public middle schools in Kansas
Schools in Pottawatomie County, Kansas